Bohemia competed at the 1908 Summer Olympics in London, England as an independent team, though it was part of Austria-Hungary at the time.

Medalists

Results by event

Athletics

Fencing

Bohemia refused to fence Italy in the silver medal match of the men's team sabre, contending that the repechage system was unfair.

Gymnastics

Tennis

Wrestling

All 4 Bohemian wrestlers lost their first match.

Notes

Sources
 
 

Nations at the 1908 Summer Olympics
1908
1908 in Austria-Hungary
Olympics